The 10th Kentucky Cavalry Regiment was a cavalry regiment that served in the Union Army during the American Civil War.

Service
The 10th Kentucky Cavalry Regiment was organized at Covington, Lexington, and Crab Orchard, Kentucky, from September 8 through November 11, 1862. It mustered in for one year under the command of Colonel Joshua Tevis.

The 10th Kentucky Cavalry mustered out of service on September 17, 1863.

Detailed service

Casualties
The regiment lost a total of 75 men during service; 13 enlisted men killed or mortally wounded, 1 officer and 61 enlisted men died of disease.

Commanders
 Colonel Joshua Tevis
 Colonel Charles J. Walker

Notable members
 Private William Louis Marshall, Company A - brigadier general & Chief of Engineers (1908–1910)

See also

 List of Kentucky Civil War Units
 Kentucky in the Civil War

References
 Dyer, Frederick H. A Compendium of the War of the Rebellion (Des Moines, IA: Dyer Pub. Co.), 1908.
Attribution

External links
 History and alphabetical roster of the 10th Kentucky Cavalry taken from Thomas Speed's Union Regiments of Kentucky

Military units and formations established in 1862
Military units and formations disestablished in 1863
Units and formations of the Union Army from Kentucky
1862 establishments in Kentucky